South Terrace may refer to:
South Terrace, Adelaide, Australia
South Terrace, Fremantle, Australia